Dick Gilbert (July 12, 1889 – May 6, 1960), was an American actor mainly associated with the Hal Roach Studios, where he appeared in numerous Our Gang and Laurel and Hardy comedies. He appeared in 52 films between 1922 and 1952

A former boxer, Gilbert was born in Knox County, Kentucky, United States and died in Goldfield, Nevada, age 70.

Partial filmography
 Near Dublin (1924)
 The White Sheep (1924)
 The Man from the West (1926)
 The Battle of the Century (1927)
 Blotto (1930)
 Beau Hunks (1931)
 Pardon Us (1931)
 Any Old Port (1932)
 The Live Ghost (1934)
 The Fixer Uppers (1935)
 Our Relations (1936)
 Chad Hanna (1940)

External links

1889 births
1960 deaths
Male actors from Kentucky
American male film actors
American male silent film actors
People from Knox County, Kentucky
20th-century American male actors